The Polygon may refer to

 Semipalatinsk Test Site
 The Polygon, Southampton

See also
 Polygon (disambiguation)